Rudyard railway station served Rudyard, Staffordshire and was opened by the North Staffordshire Railway (NSR) in 1850 on the Churnet Valley line.  In the village the NSR also owned the Rudyard Hotel as part of the company's efforts to develop Rudyard Lake and its environs as a tourist destination.

In 1926 the London, Midland and Scottish Railway renamed the station Rudyard Lake and at the same time Rudyard Lake station at the north end of the lake was renamed .

As Rudyard Lake station, it remained open until passenger services were withdrawn from the northern end of the Churnet valley line ( – ) in 1960.  Freight services lasted until 1964 when they too were withdrawn and the track lifted.

Subsequent use
In 1978 a miniature railway was built on the west side of the trackbed from Rudyard Station to the Dam. This closed two years later and was moved to the Suffolk wildlife park. and then to Trago Mills in Devon. One of the locomotives, a model of the Leek and Manifold Valley Light Railway engine No.1 E. R. Calthrope now periodically revisits the current railway at Rudyard.

A further  minimum gauge railway was started in 1985 and extended to a distance of  towards Cliffe Park station. Today the station area is used by the Rudyard Lake Steam Railway as its headquarters and as a public car park. Rudyard station now includes engine and carriage sheds, workshop, signal box, footbridge, the Platform 2 café and a level crossing. The railway has five steam locomotives and 11 carriages and a number of wagons and operates year-round. This railway celebrated its 25th anniversary in 2010.

The original up side standard gauge platform and retaining walls and flower beds are still visible. The Platform 2 cafe now uses this area for its seating and the original waiting shelter foundations for its buildings.

Route

References
Notes

Sources

External links
Rudyard Lake Steam Railway website

Disused railway stations in Staffordshire
Railway stations in Great Britain closed in 1960
Railway stations in Great Britain opened in 1850
Former North Staffordshire Railway stations
Articles containing video clips